Lei Jiahui (born 22 September 1995) is a Chinese international footballer who plays for Changchun as a midfielder.

International career
Having played for the China U-17 team in 2012 and the under-20 team in 2014, Lei made her debut for the full national team in a game against Iceland on 11 March 2013.

References

1995 births
Living people
Chinese women's footballers
China women's international footballers
2015 FIFA Women's World Cup players
Footballers from Henan
Women's association football midfielders
Changchun Zhuoyue players